Hassi Bahbah is a town and commune in Djelfa Province, Algeria. According to the 2008 census it has a population of 77,000 which is 0.221% of total Algeria population. The town lies on the N1 Trans-Saharan highway, north of the town of Aïn Maabed on GPS coordinates: 35.078, 3.028.

Hassi Bahbah municipality was established in 1959 AD, as it is considered one of the most important municipalities in the state of Djelfa in terms of population and location.

Geographical location 
It is located 242 km south of Algiers and 50 km north of the state headquarters on National Road No. 01. It occupies an area of 763 km². The municipality’s territory includes, besides the main population, two secondary communities: Hassi El Marra and Hassi El Masran.

References

Communes of Djelfa Province
Algeria